The 2004 Alabama Crimson Tide football team represented the University of Alabama during the 2004 NCAA Division I-A football season. This was the team's 72nd season in the SEC. The Crimson Tide were led by head coach Mike Shula who was entering his second season as head coach. They began their season with trying to improve from a 4–9 (2–6) record from the 2003 season. The 2004 squad finished the season with a record of 6–6 following a loss to Minnesota in the Music City Bowl.

The team began the 2004 season at 3–0 with blowout victories over Utah State, Mississippi, and Western Carolina. The Tide's starting quarterback Brodie Croyle was injured during the Western Carolina game and lost for the season. Without him, the team struggled to find consistent offense against SEC opponents Arkansas and South Carolina. The team rebounded to have multiple blowouts victories in three of the next four games, only losing to rival Tennessee. The season ended on a three-game slide, losing to rivals LSU and Auburn, also losing in the Music City Bowl to Minnesota. This season also marks the first time since 1958 in which Alabama was absent from the AP poll top 25 every week of the season while also being the first year that Alabama did not play a game at Legion Field.

Schedule

Source: Rolltide.com All-time Football Results: 2004 Season

Coaching staff

Game summaries

Utah State

Source:

Alabama opened the 2004 season by defeating the Utah State Aggies 48–17. Brian Bostick scored the first Alabama points of the game with his 28-yard field goal. On the ensuing Aggies possession, Roman Harper intercepted a Travis Cox and returned it to the Utah State 21-yard line. Two plays later, Brodie Croyle threw a 19-yard touchdown pass to Clint Johnston to give the Crimson Tide a 10–0 lead. The Aggies responded later in the first with a 35-yard Cox touchdown pass to Kevin Robinson to cut the score to 10–7. In the second quarter, Kenneth Darby scored for Alabama on a 29-yard run and Ben Chaet connected on a 44-yard field goal for Utah State to make the halftime score 17–10.

On the third play of the second half, Simeon Castille intercepted a Cox pass and returned it 31-yards for his first career touchdown. After the Alabama defense forced a punt on the ensuing Aggies drive, Croyle threw a 57-yard touchdown strike to Keith Brown on the Crimson Tide's first offensive play of the second half to give them a 31–10 lead. After a 32-yard Bostick field goal extended the Alabama lead to 34–10, the Aggies responded with their final points of the game on a 21-yard Cox touchdown pass to Chris Forbes. The Crimson Tide then closed the game with a pair of fourth-quarter touchdowns. The first came on a one-yard Tim Castille run and the second on a seven-yard Ray Hudson run in the 48–17 Alabama victory.

Ole Miss

Source:

Alabama opened conference play by defeating their long-time rival, the Ole Miss Rebels 28–7. After a scoreless first, the Crimson Tide took a 14–0 halftime lead after scoring a pair of second-quarter touchdowns. Tim Castille scored first on a one-yard run and Tyrone Prothro scored second on a 15-yard Brodie Croyle touchdown pass. Alabama extended their lead to 21–0 in the third quarter when Ray Hudson scored his first of two touchdowns on a 13-yard Croyle pass. After the Rebels scored their only points of the game on a six-yard Eric Rice touchdown reception from Ethan Flatt, Alabama responded on the following drive with a 46-yard Hudson touchdown run to make the final score 28–7. In the game, Hudson ran for 116 yards, and D. J. Hall and Keith Brown became the first freshman receivers to start for Alabama since Ozzie Newsome in 1974.

Western Carolina

Source:

Alabama won their third straight game to open the season against the Division I-AA Western Carolina Catamounts 52–0.

Arkansas

Source:

South Carolina

Source:

Kentucky

Source:

Southern Miss

Source:

Tennessee

Source:

Mississippi State

Source:

LSU

Source:

Auburn

Source:

In the 2004 edition of the Iron Bowl, the Crimson Tide took a 6–0 lead at halftime over favored Auburn, but ultimately fell 21–13 to the Tigers. Alabama took a 6–0 halftime lead on field goals of 42 and 22-yard by Brian Bostick. Auburn responded in the second half with 21 consecutive points to take a 21–6 lead. Touchdowns were scored by Cadillac Williams on a five-yard run, on a 32-yard Jason Campbell pass to Courtney Taylor and on a two-yard Ronnie Brown run. Alabama scored their only touchdown late in the fourth on an 18-yard Spencer Pennington touchdown pass to D. J. Hall to make the final score 21–13 after a failed onside kick.

Minnesota

Source:

After finishing the regular season with an overall record of 6–5, the Crimson Tide accepted an invitation to play in the Music City Bowl on December 4. Their appearance was the second for Alabama in the game, marked the first all-time meeting against the Minnesota Golden Gophers on the gridiron and a return to postseason play for the Crimson Tide following a two-year bowl ban imposed by the NCAA. Led by running backs Marion Barber III and Laurence Maroney who each rushed for over 100 yards, Minnesota defeated Alabama 20–16.

The Crimson Tide scored first when Spencer Pennington threw a two-yard touchdown pass to Le'Ron McClain for a 7–0 Alabama lead. Minnesota tied the game later in the first on a defensive touchdown. The score happened after Anthony Montgomery forced a Pennington fumble that was recovered in the endzone by Keith Lipka. The Gophers took a 17–7 lead in the second quarter after a five-yard Barber touchdown run and a 27-yard Rhys Lloyd field goal. The Crimson Tide responded with a one-yard McClain touchdown run to cut the Minnesota lead to 17–14 at halftime. The second half was dominated by both defenses with Minnesota only managing to score on a 24-yard Lloyd field goal in the third and Alabama only scoring on a safety in the fourth to make the final score 20–16.

References

Alabama
Alabama Crimson Tide football seasons
Alabama Crimson Tide football